Founded in 1957 as a corporate under the Liberian Laws and started the production of Club in 1961, Monrovia Breweries is a brewery based in Monrovia, the capital city of Liberia.  They are the primary sponsor of the Monrovia Club Breweries football team, and are a subsidiary of the Diageo alcoholic beverages company.

References

Companies based in Monrovia
1961 establishments in Liberia
Food and drink companies established in 1961
Food and drink companies of Liberia
Breweries of Africa
Diageo
n